Hsieh Cheng-peng and Yang Tsung-hua were the defending champions but chose not to participate together. Hsieh partnered Yi Chu-huan, while Yang partnered Jeevan Nedunchezhiyan. Yang lost in the first round to Wu Tung-lin and Zhang Ze. Hsieh lost in the final to Sanchai and Sonchat Ratiwatana 4–6, 6–7(4–7).

Seeds

Draw

References
 Main Draw

OEC Kaohsiung - Doubles
2016 in Taiwanese tennis